Just Once a Great Lady is a 1957 West German comedy film directed by Erik Ode and starring Gudula Blau, Grethe Weiser and Dietmar Schönherr. It has the title of a 1934 film but it is a remake of The Countess of Monte Cristo (1932).

The film's art direction is by Emil Hasler. It was shot at the Spandau Studios in Berlin.

Partial cast

See also
The Countess of Monte Cristo (1932)
The Countess of Monte Cristo (1934)
The Countess of Monte Cristo (1948)

References

External links

1957 comedy films
German comedy films
West German films
Films directed by Erik Ode
Remakes of German films
Films about con artists
Films shot at Spandau Studios
1950s German films